Vahidin Musemić (born 29 October 1946 in Janja near Bijeljina, PR Bosnia-Herzegovina, FPR Yugoslavia) is a former Bosnian footballer.

Club career
During his brilliant career with FK Sarajevo he became one of the team's legends, but he truly became known for his outstanding performances as a starting forward for the Yugoslavia national football team in the 1970s. He earned the nickname Orao (the Eagle) because of his soaring headers. He finished his career at French side OGC Nice.

International career
Musemić made his debut for Yugoslavia in an April 1968 European Championship qualification match away against France and has earned a total of 17 caps, scoring 9 goals. His final international was an October 1970 friendly match against the Soviet Union.

Personal life
Musemić's younger brother Husref is a former professional footballer and football manager, former player and manager of FK Sarajevo.

Honours
Sarajevo 
Yugoslav First League: 1966–67

Yugoslavia 
UEFA European Championship runner-up: 1968

References

External links

Profile at Serbian football federation

1946 births
Living people
People from Bijeljina
Association football forwards
Bosnia and Herzegovina footballers
Yugoslav footballers
Yugoslavia international footballers
UEFA Euro 1968 players
FK Sarajevo players
OGC Nice players
Yugoslav First League players
Ligue 1 players
Yugoslav expatriate footballers
Expatriate footballers in France
Yugoslav expatriate sportspeople in France
Bosniaks of Bosnia and Herzegovina